Dr. Attila Molnár (born 1971) is a Hungarian jurist and politician, member of the National Assembly (MP) from Fidesz Komárom-Esztergom County Regional List between 2010 and 2014. He currently serves as mayor of Komárom since October 3, 2010.

He was a member of the Constitutional, Judicial and Standing Orders Committee from May 14, 2010 to May 5, 2014, therefore he participated in the drawing up of the new constitution in 2011.

Personal life
He is married and has one child.

References

1971 births
Living people
Hungarian jurists
Fidesz politicians
Members of the National Assembly of Hungary (2010–2014)
Mayors of places in Hungary
People from Mosonmagyaróvár